Charles Lucien Lambert, also known as Lucien Lambert, Sr. (1828–1896), was an American pianist, music teacher and composer, born a free person of color in New Orleans before the American Civil War. Part of a family of prominent African-American composers, Lambert was noted for talent in music and gained international acclaim.

Early life and education
Lambert was born in New Orleans to Charles-Richard Lambert, a native of New York, and his wife, a free Creole woman of color. They were a very musical family. Free people of color constituted a special class in New Orleans, where they had privileges not available to free blacks in other areas. After his mother's death, his father married Coralie Suzanne Orzy, also a free woman of color. They had a son Sidney Lambert, born in 1838, and the half-brothers learned to be musicians together.

Marriage and family
Lambert married a French woman. Their son Lucien-Léon Guillaume Lambert, born in 1858, became a musician and composer, more well-known than his father. He was sometimes called Lucien Lambert fils (son), and his work is often confused with that of his father. Together with the work of the violinist and composer Edmond Dédé, Lucien-Leon Lambert's compositions are considered classics of Romantic Creole music. Lambert's brother Sidney also became a noted pianist and composer.

Career
Because of racism in the US, Lambert moved to France with his family in 1854, where he worked as a composer and musician. Sometime in the 1860s, he moved his family to Rio de Janeiro, Brazil, where he was so associated with French music that some historians referred to him as a French musician.  Lambert had a piano and music store in the city.  He also became part of the Brazilian National Institute of Music. In 1869 he greeted Louis Moreau Gottschalk, a contemporary French Creole whom he had known as a fellow musician in New Orleans. Both Lambert and his son Lucien played in one of Gottschalk's massive works, one calling for 31 pianists to play together. Noted students include Ernesto Nazareth.

Lambert died in Rio. He is sometimes listed as Lucien Lambert père (father), and his works are often confused with those of his son. Numerous of his compositions are held by the Bibliothèque nationale de Paris.

References

1828 births
1896 deaths
19th-century American composers
19th-century American pianists
19th-century classical composers
19th-century classical pianists
19th-century American male musicians
African-American Catholics
African-American classical composers
American classical composers
African-American classical pianists
African-American male classical composers
African-American music educators
American classical pianists
American male classical composers
American male classical pianists
American music educators